Killing Season may refer to:

 A British name for the July effect, a phenomenon in healthcare involving novice physicians
 Killing Season (2004 album)
 Killing Season (film), a 2013 American action thriller film
 The Killing Season (2015 Australian TV series), about the Rudd-Gillard Government (2007-2010)
 The Killing Season (2016 U.S. TV series), about the Long Island Serial Killer